Sayed Ali Atta (born 25 August 1913) was an Afghan field hockey player who competed at the 1936 Summer Olympic Games, playing in both of his team's games.

References

External links
 

Afghan male field hockey players
Olympic field hockey players of Afghanistan
Field hockey players at the 1936 Summer Olympics
1913 births
Year of death missing